The 2015 Eden District Council election took place on 7 May 2015 to elect members of Eden District Council in England. This was on the same day as other local elections.

Results by electoral ward

Alston Moor

Appleby (Appleby)

Appleby (Bongate)

Askham

Brough

Crosby Ravensworth

Dacre

Eamont

Greystoke

Hartside

Hesket

Kirkby Stephen

Kirkby Thore

Kirkoswald

Langwathby

Lazonby

Long Marton

Morland

Orton with Tebay

Penrith Carleton

Penrith East

Penrith North

Penrith Pategill

Penrith South

Penrith West

Ravenstonedale

Shap

Skelton

Ullswater

Warcop

References

2015 English local elections
May 2015 events in the United Kingdom
2015
2010s in Cumbria